Solomon's Temple is a church located in Aizawl Mizoram, India. The temple was constructed by the religious group Kohhran Thianghlim, translated as 'The Holy Church' in English. It was founded by Dr. L.B. Sailo in 1984. The temple is one of the largest in Mizoram state.

History 
Dr. L.B. Sailo, the founder of Kohhran Thianghlim Church, said, "In the year 1991, God showed me Solomon's Temple in my dreams. I had never thought of Solomon's temple before, nor had any dream of constructing it, but when I saw it in my dreams in 1991, as soon as I woke up, I wrote down the temple as I saw in my dream." The church was built on the western outskirts of Aizawl, the capital of the Mizoram state in India. The foundation stone was laid on December 23, 1996, and construction finished 20 years later, with a Christmas service in 2017 inaugurating the temple.

Architecture 

Area

The Temple area accommodates 2,000 people within the main hall and 10,000 within its courtyard. It is a square site measuring 180 ft. on each side. The interior of the Temple building is also square, measuring 120 ft. on each side. A 30 ft. wide verandah called 'The porch of Solomon's Temple' is attached to the exterior of the main hall on all four sides. This provides a shelter for people with its sizeable seating capacity.

Design

The main building has twelve main doors, three doors per wall. The exterior walls of the Temple face exactly South, North, East, and West.  Above the porch are four pillars, each carrying seven David's stars, meant to represent the seven churches of the Book of Revelation. On each of the pillars is a picture of the Cross of Jesus Christ and the emblem of the Holy Church. Atop the porch is an idol of two angels blowing trumpets which face the top of the pillar and flank the northern side of the pillar, which is now used as the main entrance. The temple has four towers, one on each corner. Each tower is topped with a crown, representing the Crown of Salvation, the Crown of Righteousness, the Crown of Life and the Crown of the Overcomer. There are two intersecting horizontal ridges that cross in the middle of the pitch roof such that when viewed from the air they form a cross, representing the new covenant.  The Temple has 32 windows, 32 ventilations, and 32 skylights. It is a multi-story building.

Temple Complex

Within its compound, the temple complex has a natural park covered by a selection of forest trees that provide shade and fruit for animal life. There is a restaurant for temple visitors. The complex houses an educational institution and a social service center that provides help with addiction and includes a polyclinics hospital.

Finance

The temple cost $3 million to complete. Most of the funds were contributed by church members. Donation was also collected worldwide, but the funds collected in this way were less significant.

Temple Service
The temple holds church services each Sunday, as well as for special events such as Zanlai Au Aw (Midnight Herald) Anniversary organized by the Publication Board of Kohhran Thianghlim, and Missionary Day organized by the Mission Board and Jerusalem Khawmpui in late December of each year. It is also used as a center for blood donations organized by the Church's youth wing, Youth Evangelical Front.

Gallery

References

Aizawl
Solomon's Temple
Tourist attractions in Mizoram
1996 establishments in Mizoram
Churches completed in 1996
Churches in Mizoram